Shajith Koyeri is a sound designer in the field of sync sound technique in Indian cinema. A recipient of the National Film Awards for Omkara, Shajith also won two Filmfare awards and two IIFA Awards. He is also the recipient of the Star Screen Award for Kaminey. Shajith is also known for his work in Foley editing and pre-mixing.

Early life
Shajith Koyeri was born in Punnol in Kannur district of Kerala, to Soma Sundaran and Rathibayi. He attended Brennan College in Thalassery for his higher studies. He has relocated to Mumbai in 1999.His first independent work was with the movie, Perfect Husband in 2003. Later he worked for films like Sanjay Leela Bhansali's Black and Saawariya, Shimit Amin's Ab Tak Chappan, Ketan Mehta's Mangal Pandey: The Rising, Rohan Sippy's Bluffmaster!, Shashant Shah's  Dasvidaniya  and Chalo Dilli, Aparna Sen’s 15 Park Avenue, Abhishek Chaubey’s Ishqiya, Vishal Bhardwaj's Maqbool, The Blue Umbrella, Omkara and Kaminey , 7 Khoon Maaf to jot down a few.  Besides, he has also worked on many documentaries and short films that have been showcased in film festivals around the world .
Life story of Shajith is narrated in The Echo (Graphic Novel) which appeared in Malayala Manorama

Awards and nominations

 2006 Won: National Film Award for Omkara
 2006 Won: Filmfare Award for Omkara
 2006 Nominated: Star Screen Award for Omkara
 2006 Nominated: Zee Cine Awards for Omkara
 2006 Nominated: Bollywood Movie Awards for Omkara
 2010 Won: Star Screen Award for Kaminey
 2010 Nominated: Filmfare Award for Kaminey
 2010 Nominated: Zee Cine Awards for Kaminey
 2011 Nominated: Filmfare Award for Ishqiya
 2011 Nominated: Star Screen Awardfor Ishqiya 2012 Nominated: Apsara Film & Television Producers Guild Awards for 7 Khoon Maaf 
 2012 Nominated Golden Rooster Awards for Dam999 2013 Won: IIFA Awards for Barfi! 
 2013 Nominated: Filmfare Award for Barfi! 2013 Nominated: Star Screen Award for Barfi! 2015 Won: Star Guild Awards for Haider 
 2015 Won: IIFA Awards for Haider 2015 Nominated: Filmfare Award for Haider 2016 Won: Filmfare Award for Talvar 2016: Nominated: Star Screen Award for Talvar and Dum Laga Ke Haisha 
 2017: Won: Star Screen Award for Rangoon and Dangal 

Selected filmography
Amar Kaushik's Bala (2019 film)Nitesh Tiwari's ChhichhoreZoya Akhtar's Made in Heaven (TV series)Sharat Katariya's Sui DhaagaRaj Kumar Gupta's India's Most WantedAmar Kaushik's StreeMajid Majidi's Beyond the Clouds (2017 film)
Dinesh Vijan's Raabta (film)
 Nitesh Tiwari's Dangal
 Vishal Bhardwaj’s Rangoon
 Rahul Bose’s Poorna
Manish Harishankar's Laali Ki Shaadi Mein Laaddoo Deewana
 Meghna Gulzar's Talvar
 Sharat Katariya's Dum Laga Ke Haisha
 Vishal Bhardwaj’s Haider (film)
 Anurag Basu's Barfee
 Vishal Bhardwaj’s Maqbool Vishal Bhardwaj’s Kaminey Vishal Bhardwaj’s Omkara Abhishek Chaubey’s Ishqiya Shashant Shah's Dasvidaniya Ribhu Dasgupta's Te3n
 Arnab Chaudhuri's Arjun: The Warrior Prince
 Dev Benegal’s Road, Movie Raj Kumar Gupta's Ghanchakkar (film)
 Prabhu Deva's Rambo Rajkumar (film)
 Sanjay Leela Bhansali’s Black and Saawariya Shimit Amin’s Ab Tak Chappan Ketan Mehta’s Mangal Pandey: The Rising Vishal Bhardwaj’s Saat Khoon Maaf
 Rohan Sippy’s Bluffmaster! Vishal Bhardwaj’s The Blue Umbrella Shashant Shah's Chalo Dilli Manish Jha’s Matrubhoomi-A Nation Without Women Madhur Bhandarkar’s Traffic Signal (film) Aparna Sen’s 15 Park Avenue Rajesh Pillai's Traffic (2014 film)
 Shashant Shah's Bhajathe Raho
 Aditya Datt's Table No.21
 Reema Kagti’s Talaash (2012 film) Saahil Prem’s Mad About Dance Ishraq Shah's Ek Bura Aadmi
 Sohan Roy’s Dam 999 Ajoy Varma's S.R.K Ajoy Varma's Dus Tola Feroz Abbas Khan’s Gandhi My Father Samir Karnik’s Kyun! Ho Gaya Na... Sudhir Mishra’s Hazaaron Khwaishen Aisi Roger Christian’s American Daylight Kaizad Gustad’s Boom Sriram Raghavan’s Ek Hasina Thi Aanand Surapur's The Fakir of Venice Rajat Kapoor’s Raghu Romeo Maneej Premnath's The Waiting Room Ritu serin & Tenzing's Dreaming Lhasa Rajat Kapoor’s Mithya Sanjay Gupta’s Musafir Rajshree Ojha’s Yatna Priya Singh's Perfect Husband Arjun Sajnani's Agni Varsha Rahul Bose’s Everybody Says I'm Fine! Yogesh Prathap's Boolean Mind Rajan Kumar Patel's Feast of Varanasi

Work as a Sound designer for Short films & Documentary
 Gitanjali Rao's Printed Rainbow
 Joy roy's Bimal Roy Shimona's Atreyee 
 Avijit Mukul Kishore's Snapshots from family album Eye of the fish We home chaps Turtle people Mother Teresa Orange & Lemons Gandhi 
 Rita Ranis Bombay Skies Highway 
 Zahir
Documentary
 Truck Driver ''

References

External links

Indian film score composers
Living people
Year of birth missing (living people)
People from Kannur district
Film musicians from Kerala
21st-century Indian composers
Best Audiography National Film Award winners